Blood & Chocolate is a 1986 album by Elvis Costello and the Attractions.

Blood & Chocolate may also refer to:

Blood and Chocolate (novel), a 1997 supernatural werewolf novel by Annette Curtis Klause
Blood & Chocolate (film), a 2007 film based on the novel
The soundtrack for the film